Plaza de España or Plaza Nueva (){{refn|According to the street list published by the city council, the official names are Plaza de España (Plaza Nueva) in Spanish and Espainia plaza (Plaza Berria) in Basque.|group=n.}} is a square in Vitoria-Gasteiz, Basque Country, Spain. It was declared Bien de Interés Cultural'' in 1984.

Notes

References

External links
 

Buildings and structures in Vitoria-Gasteiz
Bien de Interés Cultural landmarks in Álava
Tourist attractions in Álava